The Sadler's Ultra Challenge is a wheelchair and handcycle race that runs between Fairbanks and Anchorage, Alaska. It is the world's longest wheelchair race. Divisions include Men's Handcycle (with A, B, and C classes), Men's Wheelchair, and Women's Handcycle. The  race is run in eight stages and takes six days to complete. The annual competition began in 1984 and occurs in July of each year.

There was a virtual race in 2020.

References

1984 establishments in Alaska
Annual events in Alaska
Cycling in Alaska
July events
Recurring sporting events established in 1984
Sports competitions in Alaska
Wheelchair racing